Z34 may refer to:

Nissan 370Z, an automobile (chassis code Z34)
Chevrolet Lumina Z34, an automobile
German destroyer Z34, a warship
RFA Z.34 mortar battery; part of the 34th Division (United Kingdom)
Empire Air Force Station (NORAD id Z-34), Empire, Michigan, USA

See also

 34 (disambiguation)
 Z (disambiguation)